Evander Holyfield vs. John Ruiz, billed as Justice, was a professional boxing match contested on August 12, 2000 for the vacant WBA heavyweight championship.

Background
After Lennox Lewis defeated Evander Holyfield at the second attempt to become the undisputed heavyweight champion, the WBA ordered Lewis to face its top contender John Ruiz, where as Lewis wanted to first defend his titles against WBC and IBF number two contender Michael Grant. The WBA and Lewis agreed that he would fight Grant first followed by Ruiz. Ruiz's promoter Don King challenged the decision in court and a clause was found in Lewis' contract that stated the winner of the Holyfield–Lewis fight would first defend his titles against the WBA's number one contender. Because of this, Lewis was stripped of his WBA title. The WBA chose Holyfield to face Ruiz for the vacant WBA Heavyweight title.

The fight
Ruiz was aggressive throughout the fight landing many effective jabs, and except for late in the third round, he was never really in any serious trouble from Holyfield.

Judges Duane Ford and Dave Moretti scored the fight 114–113, while Judge Fernando Viso scored it 116–112 giving Evander Holyfield victory by unanimous decision to become the first boxer in history to be the World Heavyweight Champion four times.

Controversy
The decision was controversial as many observers and boxing reporters felt that the underdog Ruiz had done enough to win. In interviews after the fight Ruiz said "It was highway robbery without a gun,... I won the fight and he knows I won the fight...I had control of the fight. I am very surprised by the judges' decision. I don't know what fight they saw." Showtime commentators described the decision as "absurd" and "ridiculous".

Aftermath
Due to this controversial decision, an immediate rematch was ordered to take place in early 2001

Undercard
Confirmed bouts:

Broadcasting

References

World Boxing Association heavyweight championship matches
2000 in boxing
Boxing in Las Vegas
2000 in sports in Nevada
August 2000 sports events in the United States
Ruiz 1